E. O. Plauen (often stylized as e.o.plauen) was the pseudonym of Erich Ohser (18 March 1903 – 5 April 1944) (some sources give his birth year as 1909), a German cartoonist best known for his strip Vater und Sohn ("Father and Son").

Life and work
Ohser was born in Untergettengrün, nowadays an outlying centre of Adorf, in the Vogtland. When he was four years old, his family moved to Plauen (hence his choice of pseudonym). He completed his studies at the Akademie für Graphische Künste und Buchgewerbe in Leipzig in 1928, and began work at the Sächsische Sozialdemokratische Presse. In his work for such democratic magazines as Vorwärts, satirical representations of Joseph Goebbels and Adolf Hitler earned him the enmity of the Nazis, and he was prohibited from practicing his trade (Berufsverbot). He continued to work under pseudonyms, and from 1940, began again to produce cartoons on political themes. He was arrested on charges of expressing anti-Nazi opinions (reichsfeindliche Äußerungen).

On 5 April 1944, the day before his trial, Ohser committed suicide in his cell.

E.O.Plauen also did the black and white illustrations in the satirical poetry books 'Herz auf Taille' and 'Ein Mann gibt Auskunft' by Erich Kaestner (Atrium Verlag Zuerich).

Vater und Sohn

Vater und Sohn was a generally wordless feature consisting typically of five or six panels, in which a stout, bald man with a moustache and his young son Eric get into and out of various predicaments regarding day-to-day events. The strip featured slapstick humour most of all (spankings are frequent) but emphasizes the tender and conspiratorial relationship between the two. The strip appeared from 1934 to 1937 in the Berliner Illustrirte Zeitung, for a total of 157 episodes.

In the early 1990s, the feature was also transformed into a children's book series by Iranian publisher, 'Vazheh', which included explanations of the cartoons (in Persian) along with the strip on the opposite page.

Memorials
In 1968 his ashes were interred in the central cemetery of his hometown, which took over responsibility for the grave's maintenance in 1988. The Städtische Galerie in Karlsruhe mounted an exhibition of his works in 2001. He is also remembered with the E.O. Plauen prize for an outstanding living caricaturist. Moreover, his "Vater und Sohn" characters have a statue in his hometown, where the figures also appear on storefronts and tram schedules

Vater und Sohn also inspired the Belgian comic strip Piet Fluwijn en Bolleke (1947-1974) by Marc Sleen, which is also a gag-a-day comic about a father and his son.

On 18 March 2018, Google celebrated Erich Ohser’s 115th birthday with a doodle.

Sources

External links

http://lambiek.net/artists/p/plauen_eo.htm
http://www.kunstsam.de/cartoon_vater_und_sohn.html
https://web.archive.org/web/20080913154308/http://www.e.o.plauen.de/site/vaterundsohn.html

1903 births
1944 suicides
People from Vogtlandkreis
People from the Kingdom of Saxony
German illustrators
20th-century German painters
20th-century German male artists
German male painters
German caricaturists
German comics artists
German satirists
German resistance members
Political repression in Nazi Germany
Suicides in Germany
People who committed suicide in prison custody